Sociedad Colombo Alemana de Transportes Aéreos ), or SCADTA, was the world's second airline, and the first airline in Latin America, operating from 1919 until World War II. After the war, SCADTA merged with Colombian regional carrier Colombian Air Service, or SACO. Together, SCADTA and SACO formed Avianca - Aerovías Nacionales de Colombia, the Colombian flag-carrier. Avianca still operates to this day and claims SCADTA's history as its own, thus making it the world's second-oldest active airline, after KLM from the Netherlands.

History

SCADTA started out as a small airmail carrier using Junkers seaplanes capable of landing on Colombia's Magdalena River, mostly since there were very few suitable landing strips in Colombia at the time. The German nationality of some of SCADTA's owners motivated the United States government to subsidize Pan American World Airways' expansion in Latin America under the Hoover administration. SCADTA was barred from operating flights to the United States and the Panama Canal, although it continued to maintain a broad route network throughout the Andean region. The formation of Pan American-Grace Airways in the 1930s further eroded SCADTA's position in the market. Prior to World War II, principal shareholder and Austrian industrialist Peter Paul von Bauer was forced by the US and Colombian governments to sell his shares to the Pan American World Airways in an attempt to protect the airline from acquisition by Nazi Germany. Following the Japanese attack on Pearl Harbor in late 1941, SCADTA was forced to cease operations and its assets were merged by the Colombian government into the state-owned airline, SACO, forming the modern Colombian national carrier: Avianca.

See also
Colombia during World War II

External links

The Battersea Review - Scadta/Panamerican relationship Scroll to middle of page.

References

Airlines established in 1919
Airlines disestablished in 1940
Avianca
History of Colombia
Defunct seaplane operators